"Rags to Riches" is a 1953 popular song by Richard Adler and Jerry Ross.

Background
It is based on a famous Russian tune called "Volga Melody" by Yuri Shchetkov sometimes known as "Samara My Lovely Town." The bridge passage or middle 8 was inserted by the composer.

Tony Bennett recording
The best-known version of the song, recorded by Tony Bennett with Percy Faith and his orchestra, was number one for eight weeks on the Billboard chart in 1953 and became a gold record. In 2012, he recorded a Spanglish version with bachata singer Romeo Santos for his album Viva Duets.

Other versions
Later in 1953, a version by David Whitfield reached number three in the British charts 
Another version in 1953, by Billy Ward and his Dominoes with Jackie Wilson singing lead made number two on Billboard's Most Played in Juke Boxes chart.
Later recordings by Sunny & the Sunliners (#45 in 1963) and Elvis Presley (#33 in 1971) also made the Billboard charts.
On June 17th 2021, Geordie Greep of Black Midi performed the song for the "Black Midi Variety Hour" on NTS Radio.

In popular culture
Tony Bennett's version was featured in the opening sequence of the 1990 film Goodfellas. 
The opening line of the song was sung regularly and exuberantly by the character Carmine Ragusa on the television series Laverne & Shirley, typically when he had good news.
The song was also used in an episode of Columbo.
Jackie Wilson's version of the song is featured in the 2010 video game Mafia II.

See also
List of number-one singles of 1953 (U.S.)

References

1953 songs
Tony Bennett songs
David Whitfield songs
Songs written by Richard Adler
Songs written by Jerry Ross (composer)
Number-one singles in the United States